FICTS (Federation Internationale Cinema Television Sportifs) is the Federation of Sport Televisions and of the images on screen. Founded in 1983, it recognised by the International Olympic Committee (IOC) for which it promotes the values of sport through film and television. 116 countries are members. It is chaired by Franco Ascani (Member of IOC Culture and Olympic Heritage Commission). It is the only international Federation headquartered in Milan.

Sport Movies and TV – Milano International FICTS Fest 
FICTS organizes the Sport Movies & TV - Milano International FICTS Fest. It is the world's finals of the "World FICTS Challenge", the Worldwide Championship of Cinema, Television and Sport Culture, organized in 16 festivals across five continents.

World FICTS Challenge 
FICTS promotes and organizes the annual Worldwide Championship of Sport, Cinema and Television "WORLD FICTS CHALLENGE" programmed in 16 festivals in five continents. Winning productions of each phase are automatically admitted to the final phase.

2017 
The phases of the "World FICTS Challenge 2017" are:

2019 
The phases of the "World FICTS Challenge 2019" are:

FICTS "Hall of Fame" 
FICTS Honorary Members: Thomas Bach; Ching Kuo Wu; Anita DeFrantz; Mario Pescante; Francesco Ricci Bitti; Mohamed Al Fayed.

Celebrities: Pope John Paul II; Franco Baresi; Max Biaggi; Sergey Bubka; Emilio Butraguegno; Fabio Cannavaro; Josè Carreras; Johan Cruijff; Dick Fosbury; Marvin Hagler; Hugh Laurie; Yelena Isinbayeva; Marcello Lippi; Pietro Mennea; Paul Newman; Pelè; Robert Redford; Juan A. Samarach; Martin Scorsese; Andriy Shevchenko; Hristo Stoichkov; Alberto Tomba; Mike Tyson; Alex Zanardi.

References 

Sports television
International Olympic Committee